Bentall may refer to:

 Bentall (surname)
 Bentall 5, a skyscraper in Vancouver, British Columbia, Canada
 Bentall Building, an historic building in Victoria, British Columbia, Canada
 Bentall Centre, Kingston upon Thames, a shopping centre in London, England
 Bentall Centre, Vancouver, Canada, an office complex and underground shopping mall
 Bentall procedure, a cardiac surgery operation pioneered by Hugh Bentall
 , an agricultural and automotive manufacturer founded by Edward Hammond Bentall
 Bentalls, a U.K. department store chain